Ryan Zonath Salazar Rivera (born 25 February 1982 in Lima) is a Peruvian footballer who plays as a midfielder. He is currently playing for Unión Huaral in the Peruvian Segunda División .

Honours

Club
Alianza Lima:
Peruvian First Division: 2001
Universidad San Martín:
Peruvian First Division: 2007, 2008

External links

1982 births
Living people
Footballers from Lima
Association football midfielders
Peruvian footballers
Academia Deportiva Cantolao players
Club Alianza Lima footballers
Sport Coopsol Trujillo footballers
FC Lokomotivi Tbilisi players
Atlético Universidad footballers
Unión Huaral footballers
Club Deportivo Universidad de San Martín de Porres players
Cienciano footballers
José Gálvez FBC footballers
Colegio Nacional Iquitos footballers
Sport Huancayo footballers
Real Garcilaso footballers
Atlético Minero footballers
Universidad Técnica de Cajamarca footballers
Peruvian expatriate footballers
Expatriate footballers in Georgia (country)